Toshichi Iwata (岩田 藤七, Iwata Tōshichi, 1893-1980) was a Japanese glass artist considered to be the founding father of modern art glass making in Japan. Active from 1927 until his death, he created unique studio works as well as production pieces. During his lifetime, Iwata was considered to be Japan's foremost authority on modern glass craft.

Career 

Toshichi Iwata studied Western painting under Saburosuke Okada at the Hakuba-kai Western Painting Institute in 1911. Iwata attended the Tokyo School of Fine Arts for twelve years, where he studied metal work and Western oil painting. He learned engraving from Shomin Unno and Shigeyuki Hirata, and lacquer art from Shisui Rokkaku. He studied sculpture under Taimu Tatehata in 1922.

Iwata graduated in 1918 from the metal craft department and earned a BA in Western oil painting in 1923. It was during this time that he became interested in crafting art glass and ultimately chose to pursue a career as a glass artist. Iwata next studied under Imamura Shigezo at the Tachibana Glass Factory. From 1927 until 1937 he worked as a designer for the Tokyo Tokei watch company and also participated in glass research at the Iwaki Glass Laboratory before 1930. In 1931 he founded the Iwata Glass Manufacturing Co., LTD. He became a member of the Tokyo Prefectural Art Preservation Council and Tokyo Crafts Association Exhibition of Arts and Crafts Department Exhibition Jury in 1941. 

His studio, in 1943, was designated as a glass manufacturing residual factory and Iwata,  individually, as a person qualified in preserving important craft technology by the Ministry of Commerce and Industry. His 10th solo exhibition was temporarily suspended, in 1944, due to the intensification of the war. He exhibited at a special wartime exhibition which was purchased by the government.

World War II apparently disrupted Iwata's endeavors and in 1947 he and his wife founded the Iwata Glass Industrial Company where factory art glass was produced by workers and unique pieces were produced by members of the Iwata family. 

He was appointed a Chief Judge of the Japan Exhibition in 1957 and Advisor to the Japan Exhibition in 1958. He was a member of the Japan Glass Crafts Association Award Selection Committee in 1962 and became Standing Director of the Japan Glass Crafts Association in 1966. In 1972 he was one of the founders of the Japan Glass Art and Crafts Association and became an Honorary Member. Other founders included his previous student Kyohei Fujita and his son Hisatoshi Iwata.

Exhibitions 

Iwata exhibited at the 4th Imperial Exhibition "Deep Sky" (sculpture) for the first time in 1922. He received a Certificate of Commendation from the 12th Craft Exhibition (Metalworking) of the Ministry of Commerce and Industry in 1925. He won the Ministry of Commerce and Industry 13th Craft Exhibition (Metalworking) 3rd prize in 1926. After being selected three times in a row from the 9th Imperial Exhibition in 1928, Iwata then exhibited every year at the Imperial Exhibition, Bun Exhibition, and Nitten Exhibition. Iwata established a workshop in Kosuge-cho, Katsushika-ku in 1931 and exhibited glass from the 8th Imperial Exhibition onward. Iwata exhibited his work at the Nitten National Exhibition, before and after the Second World War. He served as an exhibition judge there later in life. He held his first solo exhibition in 1935. Iwata won the Silver Award at the 1937 Paris Universal Crafts Exhibition. Iwata received the Japan Art Academy Prize in 1951. He received the Mainichi Art Award in 1969 and was recognized as a Person of Cultural Merit in 1970. He was awarded the Order of the Sacred Treasure in 1980 by the Emperor for his lifetime of devotion to the arts.

Public collections 

Works by Toshichi Iwata have been collected by numerous museums and galleries, including The National Museums of Modern Art, in Tokyo and Kyoto and the Hokkaido Museum of Modern Art in Sapporo, Hokkaido. Several of his pieces are held in the Metropolitan Museum of Art, New York. A survey of his work in book form was published in Japan in 1993. 

Works bearing the Iwata Glass Company label are often attributed as the work of Toshichi Iwata, or other members of his family, but are hand made art glass produced by workers in his factory. The original design for the factory glass was typically created by a member of the Iwata family, especially in the early years of operation. Toshichi Iwata was known to join his workers on the factory floor, from time to time, but labeled work should not be attributed to him but to his factory. Studio works by Toshichi Iwata were typically accompanied by a wooden tomobako, which he also made and signed. His studio works were not signed or labeled. Iwata factory produced art glass is also often found in museum and gallery collections, though not always properly attributed.

Personal life 

Iwata was born on 12 March 1893 in Nihonbashi, Tokyo. As a child, Iwata was known as Tojiro. Iwata was married to Kuniko "Kuni" Kyuichi, the eldest daughter of sculptor Takeuchi Kyuichi. 

The oldest son of Toshichi and Kuniko Iwata, Hisatoshi "Kuri" Iwata, was also a well known glass artist as were Hisatoshi's wife, Itoko and their daughter, Ruri.

Toshichi Iwata died on 23 August 1980.

References 

Japanese artists
Glass artists
1893 births
1980 deaths
People from Tokyo
Tokyo School of Fine Arts alumni